Mario Falcone is an English television personality known for starring in The Only Way Is Essex.

Mario Falcone or Mario Falconi may also refer to:

 Mario Falcone (DC Comics), fictional character in the DC Universe

See also
 Mario Falconi, priest